A Hingchabi is a mythical creature in Meitei mythology, folklore and religion (Sanamahism) of Antique Kangleipak (Ancient Manipur). She has characters similar to those of the vampires as well as the witches.
The terms, "hing" means "raw" and "chaa" means "to eat" in Meitei language (Manipuri language).

Sources

References 

Meitei mythology
Meitei literature
Meitei folklore
Pages with unreviewed translations